Japan and China each launched their first satellites in 1970, bringing the total number of nations with independent launch capability to five.

Apollo 13 was launched; after suffering an explosion in deep space it had to circumnavigate the moon and use the LM as a life boat.  Apollo 13 was a successful disaster in which the crew survived.  The Soviet space program continued its Luna program with Luna 17, which delivered the robotic Lunokhod 1 rover to the lunar surface, and Luna 16, which achieved the first uncrewed lunar sample return.  The Soviets also continued the success of the Venera Venus probes with Venera 7, the first man-made spacecraft to successfully land on another planet and to transmit data back to Earth, though it only survived 23 minutes on the surface.

Launches
This is a list of spaceflights launched in 1970.

|colspan = 8|

February
|-

|colspan=8|

March
|-

|colspan=8|

April
|-

|colspan=8|

June
|-

|colspan=8|

September

|-

|colspan=8|

October

|-

|colspan=8|

December
|-

|}

Launches from the Moon 

|}

Deep Space Rendezvous

References

Footnotes

 
Spaceflight by year